The Consciousness Industry is a term coined by author and theorist Hans Magnus Enzensberger, which identifies the mechanisms through which the human mind is reproduced as a social product. Foremost among these mechanisms are the institutions of mass media and education. According to Enzensberger, the mind industry does not produce anything specific; rather, its main business is to perpetuate the existing order of man's domination over man.

Hans Haacke elaborates on the consciousness industry as it applies to the arts in a wider system of production, distribution, and consumption. Haacke specifically implicates museums as manufacturers of aesthetic perception that fail to acknowledge their intellectual, political, and moral authority: "rather than sponsoring intelligent, critical awareness, museums thus tend to foster appeasement."

See also 

Institutional Critique
The Consciousness Industry: On Literature, Politics and the Media
Hans Magnus Enzensberger
Hans Haacke

References

Enzensberger, H. M. (1974). The Consciousness Industry: On Literature, Politics and the Media. New York: Continuum Books/ Seabury Press. Michael Roloff, editor and translator. The companion volume to this title that I edited there is POLITICS + CRIME.
Haacke, H. (1983/2006). "Museums: Managers of consciousness," in Hans Haacke : For real : Works 1959-2006. M. Flügge & R. Fleck (eds.), H. Haacke & S. Lindberg (trans.) pp. 273–281. Düsseldorf : Richter.

External links 

Museums: Managers of Consciousness 

Consciousness
Industries (economics)